TOKIN Corporation  is a Japanese electrical and electronic industrial and automotive parts manufacturing company. Since April 2017 it has been a wholly owned subsidiary of KEMET Corporation. Previously it was named  and was part of the NEC Group. It is headquartered in Shiroishi, Miyagi Prefecture, Japan.

In February 2013, KEMET Corporation invested in the company to provide capital for Tokin to expand its business. After this investment, KEMET owned 34% of the company, and NEC owned a 66% controlling share.

In September 2015, TOKIN pleaded guilty to fixing the prices of electrolytic capacitors between 2002 and 2013 in a criminal lawsuit filed in the United States District Court for the Northern District of California by the United States Department of Justice, and was required to pay a fine of $13.8 million USD.

In April 2017, KEMET  purchased a 61% controlling interest, making Tokin its wholly owned subsidiary. Once the purchase was complete, the company changed its name to "TOKIN Corporation".

References

External links

Companies based in Miyagi Prefecture
Electrical engineering companies of Japan
Electronics companies of Japan
NEC subsidiaries
Shiroishi, Miyagi
Japanese companies established in 1938
Japanese brands